Khin Maung Cho (born 3 November 1950) is the Burmese politician and incumbent Minister for Industry of Myanmar (Burma).

Early life and education 
Khin Maung Cho was born on 3 November 1950 to Ba Cho, a retired communications engineer, and Ma Ma Gyi, a retired school teacher, in Meiktila, Burma (now Myanmar).

Career 
On 22 March 2016, he was nominated to be Minister for Industry in President Htin Kyaw's Cabinet. On 24 March, the Assembly of the Union confirmed his nomination.

He previously served as an executive engineer at Super Seven Stars Company (SSS), the authorised distributor of Kia Motors. From 2013 to 2015, it is alleged that SSS has dodged billions of kyats in tax.

Personal life 
Khin Maung Cho is married to Thit Thit Aung, the head of the branch directorate of industrial cooperation within the Ministry of Industry, and has no children.

References

Government ministers of Myanmar
Living people
1950 births
People from Mandalay Region